The Special Reconnaissance Unit, also known as the 14 Field Security and Intelligence Company (internally "The Det") was a part of the British Army Intelligence Corps involved in plainclothes operations in Northern Ireland from the 1970s onwards.

The unit conducted undercover surveillance operations against suspected members of Irish republican and loyalist paramilitary groups. Its troops were recruited from line battalions and trained in an eight-week course by the Special Air Service (SAS). An initial deployment of 120 men took place in November 1972. They are commandos trained for clandestine operation, counterinsurgency, covert operation, intelligence gathering, military intelligence, special reconnaissance, surveillance, tracking down and arresting or killing members IRA missions. Allegations of collusion with loyalist paramilitaries were made against the unit. In 1987, the unit became part of the newly formed United Kingdom Special Forces directorate. The unit formed the Special Reconnaissance Regiment in 2005.

Predecessor
The Special Reconnaissance Unit, also known as 14 Intelligence Company was the successor to the Military Reaction Force (MRF).  Selection to 14 Intelligence Company was available to all serving members of the British armed forces and to both sexes. For the first time, women could become members of a UK Special Forces unit. Candidates were required to pass a rigorous selection process, designed to select the individuals who possessed the necessary qualities to deal with undercover covert operations they'd be tasked with.  In one selection course, out of 1000 applicants who applied, only 17 were deployed to Northern Ireland.

Wilson briefing
"Special Reconnaissance Unit" is the term appearing in official documents from the 1970s. An April 1974 briefing for Prime Minister Harold Wilson states:
The term "Special Reconnaissance Unit" and the details of its organisation and mode of operations have been kept secret. The SRU operates in Northern Ireland at present under the cover name "Northern Ireland Training and Advisory Teams (Northern Ireland)" – NITAT(NI) – ostensibly the equivalent of genuine NITAT teams in UKLF and BAOR.

Structure
Authors claiming to be former members of the unit describe an organisation with a depot in Great Britain and four operational detachments in Northern Ireland.

Main Det (Headquarters), RAF Aldergrove
East Det, based at Palace Barracks, Belfast
North Det, based at Ballykelly, County Londonderry
South Det based in Fermanagh

Selection and training of personnel from all arms of the British Armed Forces was conducted in a number of locations in Great Britain.  Candidates, both male and female, volunteered for special duties for periods of 18–36 months, before being returned to a parent unit.  Trained surveillance operators could volunteer for re-deployment after a period with the parent unit, with potential opportunities to serve in command, staff or training roles within the organisation or higher command structure.

Weapons issued 
While the unit was active, there was a wide variety of firearms utilized by the unit.
 Browning Hi Power 9×19mm pistol
 Walther P5 9×19mm pistol
 Walther PPK .22 Long Rifle (preferred as backup weapon or primary for female operatives)
 Heckler & Koch MP5K 9×19mm sub-machine gun
 Heckler & Koch HK33 – HK53 variant used as carbine and chambered in 5.56×45mm
 Heckler & Koch G3KA4 7.62×51mm

Collusion accusations
14 Intelligence was accused of acting in collusion with loyalist paramilitaries by former intelligence personnel Fred Holroyd and Colin Wallace in regards to the death of senior Provisional Irish Republican Army member John Francis Green, the Miami Showband killings and the Dublin and Monaghan bombings.

Casualties
14 April 1974 – Captain Anthony Pollen was shot dead by the IRA in Derry while carrying out undercover surveillance on a demonstration in the Bogside area.
14 December 1977: Corporal Paul Harman was shot dead by the IRA in west Belfast. Harman was undercover when he stopped his red Morris Marina on Monagh Avenue. An IRA unit approached the car and shot him in the head and back and torched the car.
11 August 1978: Lance Corporal Alan Swift was shot dead while undercover in the Bogside area of Derry City. Two IRA members fired into the corporal's car with automatic rifles.
6 May 1979: Sergeant Robert Maughan was shot dead outside a church in Lisnaskea
21 February 1984: Sergeant Paul Oram was killed in an incident in mainly nationalist Dunloy, Ballymoney when he and a colleague were surprised during the night by an IRA unit operating in the area. Oram and his colleague drew their pistols and engaged the men, striking Declan Martin (18) and Henry Hogan (21). Oram was killed almost instantly. According to his colleague, the two IRA members fell to the ground and were still alive, but he killed them as, in his opinion, they still constituted a threat. Oram's colleague was seriously wounded but team-members stationed nearby assisted, and he survived.
19 March 1988: Corporals Derek Wood and David Howes were killed when they drove into a IRA funeral in Belfast. It is alleged by former British soldier Seán Hartnett that the corporals were members of a military surveillance unit known as the Joint Communications Unit (JCU).

See also 
Military Reaction Force
Force Research Unit
United Kingdom Special Forces

References

External links
 

Special forces of the United Kingdom
14 Intelligence Company
14 Intelligence Company
British Army in Operation Banner
Military units and formations of the British Army
Military intelligence
Military units and formations established in 1972
Military units and formations disestablished in 2005